Mahmoud Karkar (born 21 October 1974) is a Syrian footballer who plays for Al-Wahda, including in the 2014 AFC Cup group stage.

References

External links

1974 births
Living people
Syrian footballers
Syria international footballers
Al-Ittihad Aleppo players
Association football goalkeepers
Sportspeople from Aleppo
Syrian Premier League players